Gemmula interpolata is a species of sea snail, a marine gastropod mollusk in the family Turridae, the turrids.

Description
The length of the shell attains 23 mm.

Distribution
This marine specimen was found off Laysan Island, northwest of, Hawaii, North Pacific Ocean

References

 Powell, A.W.B. 1967. The family Turridae in the Indo-Pacific. Part 1a. The Turrinae concluded. Indo-Pacific Mollusca 1(7): 409-443, pls 298-317

External links
  Tucker, J.K. 2004 Catalog of recent and fossil turrids (Mollusca: Gastropoda). Zootaxa 682:1-1295.

interpolata
Gastropods described in 1967